The 2021 NXT WarGames was the fifth annual and final NXT WarGames professional wrestling pay-per-view (PPV) and livestreaming event produced by WWE. It was held exclusively for wrestlers from the promotion's NXT brand division, which reverted to being WWE's developmental territory in September. The event took place on December 5, 2021, at the WWE Performance Center in Orlando, Florida, and was the first WarGames to air on the livestreaming service Peacock. It was also the last WWE PPV and livestreaming event to carry the term "pay-per-view" as WWE began to use the term "premium live event" for these major events beginning with Day 1 the following month.

This was NXT's first WarGames event to not carry the NXT TakeOver name, as the events from 2017 to 2020 were held as a subseries of TakeOvers titled "TakeOver: WarGames". It was subsequently NXT's first PPV and livestreaming event following the discontinuation of the TakeOver series, and subsequently NXT's first event to not be promoted under the TakeOver name since Halftime Heat in February 2019. It was also the brand's first PPV and livestreaming event held following its restructuring as NXT 2.0, which reverted the brand to its original function as WWE's developmental territory. This was also NXT's last major event to air on traditional PPV, as in 2022, WWE shifted to only broadcasting NXT's major events on the livestreaming platforms. In 2022, the WarGames concept was moved to the main roster as part of Survivor Series with the NXT WarGames event being replaced by NXT Deadline.

There were five matches scheduled on the event's card, as well as one dark match that occurred before the live broadcast. Of the five matches that were broadcast live for the event, two were WarGames matches. In the main event, Team 2.0 (Bron Breakker, NXT North American Champion Carmelo Hayes, Grayson Waller, and Tony D'Angelo) defeated Team Black & Gold (Johnny Gargano, LA Knight, Pete Dunne, and NXT Champion Tommaso Ciampa) in the men's WarGames match, while in the opening bout, Cora Jade, Io Shirai, Kay Lee Ray, and Raquel González defeated Toxic Attraction (NXT Women's Champion Mandy Rose and NXT Women's Tag Team Champions Gigi Dolin and Jacy Jayne) and Dakota Kai in the women's WarGames match.

Production

Background 
From 2017 to 2020, WWE's NXT brand held an annual subseries of events under the TakeOver series titled WarGames, based around the WarGames match. In September 2021, the NXT brand went through a restructuring, being rebranded as "NXT 2.0", reverting, in part, to a developmental territory for WWE. In October, it was speculated that the company may end the TakeOver series as another TakeOver event was not scheduled for 2021 after TakeOver 36 in August.

On November 9, 2021, NXT's fifth WarGames event was announced to be held on December 5, 2021, at the WWE Performance Center in Orlando, Florida. The announcement confirmed that the event would not be a TakeOver event, thus marking NXT's first event to air on pay-per-view (PPV) and via livestreaming following TakeOver's discontinuation, as well as the first non-TakeOver to air on any of these broadcast outlets since Halftime Heat in February 2019. It was also the brand's first PPV and livestreaming event held following its rebranding as "NXT 2.0". It was also the first WarGames to livestream on Peacock after the American version of the WWE Network merged under Peacock in March; other countries maintained the WWE Network service. On the day of the event's announcement, WWE had originally made a post on Twitter that had the event titled as "TakeOver: WarGames"; however, the tweet was quickly deleted and WWE reposted the announcement with the "TakeOver" title removed.

Storylines 

The card included matches that resulted from scripted storylines, where wrestlers portrayed heroes, villains, or less distinguishable characters that built tension and culminated in a wrestling match or series of matches. Results were predetermined by WWE's writers on the NXT brand, while storylines were produced on the weekly television program, NXT.

At NXT: Halloween Havoc on October 26, Raquel González lost the NXT Women's Championship to Mandy Rose after interference from Dakota Kai. A match between González and Kai was later scheduled for the November 16 episode of NXT, which ended in a disqualification win for González after interference from Toxic Attraction (Rose and NXT Women's Tag Team Champions Gigi Dolin and Jacy Jayne). After the match, Cora Jade attacked Dolin and Jayne, only for Rose to overpower her. Io Shirai then grabbed a crutch from the injured Zoey Stark and attacked Kai and Toxic Attraction with it, sending them retreating. Shirai, Jade, and González then challenged Toxic Attraction and Kai to a WarGames match at NXT WarGames. A day later, the match was made official. The following week, Rose lost to Jade in a non-title match after interference from Kay Lee Ray, who later joined Shirai, Jade, and González's WarGames team. On the November 30 episode, Ray defeated Kai in a ladder match to earn her team the WarGames advantage.

At NXT: Halloween Havoc, Tommaso Ciampa defeated Bron Breakker to retain the NXT Championship. On the November 23 episode of NXT, Halloween Havoc hosts Grayson Waller and LA Knight engaged in a brawl that spilled backstage. Later that night, Carmelo Hayes retained the NXT North American Championship against Johnny Gargano and Pete Dunne in a triple threat match after interference from Tony D'Angelo. After the match, the brawl between Waller and Knight returned to the ring before Ciampa sent Hayes, D'Angelo, and Waller retreating. However, Breakker appeared and sided with Hayes, D'Angelo, and Waller. They then challenged Ciampa, Knight, Dunne, and Gargano to a WarGames match before the two teams brawled as the show ended. A day later, the match was made official for NXT WarGames. On the November 30 episode, Breakker defeated Gargano in a ladder match to earn his team the WarGames advantage.

At NXT: Halloween Havoc, Cameron Grimes was invited to Duke Hudson's Poker Room on the following week's episode, where he beat him with a full house of 2's against his Aces. On the November 16 episode of NXT, Hudson challenged Grimes to a poker showdown where he lost again due to his bluff, and powerbombed him through the poker table before trimming his beard and ponytail. The following week, a short-haired Grimes challenged Hudson to a hair vs. hair match at NXT WarGames, which he accepted.

On the November 23 episode of NXT, Malcolm Bivens and the Diamond Mine confronted Joe Gacy in the ring for stealing the spotlight away from them last week, and wanted to take it back by asking him to leave the ring so that Ivy Nile could have her match. Gacy respected Nile's right to have a match but had no respect for NXT Cruiserweight Champion Roderick Strong, saying his name invoked "toxic masculinity" and that the cruiserweight division divided people by promoting exclusivity and "weight shaming". Strong said he wanted to embarrass Gacy, leading Bivens to set up a match between the two at NXT WarGames. The following week, Gacy (accompanied by Harland) hosted an all-inclusive invitational in response to the Cruiserweight division being a "toxic environment" that left out "height, weight, and gender bias." After Gacy's matches against two enhancement talents, Gacy left Strong lying following a handspring clothesline before retreating with Harland.

On the November 30 episode of NXT, Kyle O'Reilly and Von Wagner defeated Legado Del Fantasma (Joaquin Wilde and Raul Mendoza) to become the number one contenders for Imperium's (Fabian Aichner and Marcel Barthel) NXT Tag Team Championship. The match was subsequently scheduled for NXT WarGames.

Event

Dark match 
Before the event went live on pay-per-view and the streaming services, Odyssey Jones defeated Andre Chase in a dark match.

Preliminary matches 
The actual event began with the women's WarGames match, which saw Cora Jade, Kay Lee Ray, Io Shirai, and Raquel González take on Toxic Attraction (Mandy Rose, Gigi Dolin, and Jacy Jayne) and Dakota Kai. Kai and Ray started the match. Ray dominated the first few minutes. As Ray's team had the WarGames advantage, Jade entered next. Ray performed a KLR Bomb on Kai onto a trash can wrapped around Dolin before Shirai entered next. She brought multiple chairs and another trash can into the cage. However, Kai performed a Pump Kick on Shirai as she entered the cage. Kai and Dolin then dominated Shirai and Jade. Dolin then sent Jade into the cage wall before Jayne entered next. She brought a table into the cage while Dolin set it up. After the tide shifted, Shirai, Ray, and Jade placed Jayne onto the table, and Jade performed a Senton from the top of the cage on Jayne through it, dislocating her left shoulder in the process. Shirai then placed Jade's shoulder back into place, after which, González entered next with Rose entering last. Rose set her sights on the injured Jade until Shirai attacked her. After Rose, Dolin, and Jayne dominated González, Jade broke up a pinning attempt with a kendo stick. Rose performed a Bicycle Knee to Jade's injured shoulder, but Jade kicked out. In the climax, González performed a Chingona Bomb on Jayne, after which, González and Dolin took each other out. Jade then pinned Jayne to win the match for her team.

In the second match, Imperium (Fabian Aichner and Marcel Barthel) defended the NXT Tag Team Championship against Kyle O'Reilly and Von Wagner. In the closing moments, after an evenly contested match, O'Reilly applied a Kimura Lock on Aichner, who made it to his feet, and he and Barthel performed the European Bomb on O'Reilly to retain the titles. After the match, Wagner attempted to attack O'Reilly, but O'Reilly saw it coming and attacked Wagner before doing The Undisputed Era handsign and crotch drop. O'Reilly then brawled with Wagner as he walked away.

In the third match, Cameron Grimes took on Duke Hudson in a hair vs. hair match. In the closing moments, Hudson attempted a Razor's Edge on Grimes, but Grimes countered into a hurricanrana into the turnbuckle and rolled up Hudson to win the match. After the match, Hudson performed a Clothesline on Grimes and attempted to shave his hair, but Grimes recovered and performed a Cave In on Hudson before shaving his hair.

Following this, it was announced that NXT: New Year's Evil would take place on January 4, 2022.

In the penultimate match, Roderick Strong (accompanied by Diamond Mine) defended the NXT Cruiserweight Championship against Joe Gacy. During the match, Gacy performed a Brainbuster on Strong for a one count. Strong performed an Angle Slam on Gacy for a nearfall. Strong applied a Boston Crab on Gacy, who escaped. Gacy then applied a Crossface on Strong, who also escaped. Gacy performed a Tope Con Hilo on Strong and The Creed Brothers (Brutus Creed and Julius Creed). In the climax, Harland appeared and lifted up Ivy Nile, but Gacy told him to put her down. Gacy then performed a Gutwrench Powerbomb on Strong for a nearfall. Strong then performed a Jumping Knee and an End of Heartache on Gacy to retain the title.

Before the main event, Kyle O'Reilly was interviewed backstage about his attack on Von Wagner, and also talked about not being in a WarGames match for the first time since WWE began using the concept. O'Reilly then challenged Wagner to a Steel Cage match for the following episode of NXT.

Main event 
The main event was the men's WarGames match, which saw Team 2.0 (Bron Breakker, Carmelo Hayes, Tony D'Angelo, and Grayson Waller, accompanied by Trick Williams) take on Team Black & Gold (Johnny Gargano, Pete Dunne, LA Knight, and Tommaso Ciampa). Hayes and Gargano began the match. Team 2.0 had the WarGames advantage as Waller entered next. Williams tossed a chair into the cage and attempted to climb the cage, only for Gargano to use the chair to knock Williams off. Dunne entered next. Waller then performed Stunners on Dunne and Gargano before D'Angelo entered next. Williams brought kendo sticks, a table, and a trash can in the cage before Dexter Lumis, who Hayes and Williams viciously attacked a few weeks earlier, appeared from underneath the ring, sending Williams running. D'Angelo padlocked the cage shut before Knight entered next. He climbed the cage and dominated D'Angelo, Waller, and Hayes himself. Referees unlocked the cage with bolt cutters before Breakker entered next. Breakker proceeded to dominate Team Black & Gold until Ciampa entered last. Notable moments that occurred after WarGames officially began included Knight performing a belly-to-belly suplex from the top rope on Waller through a table, Waller performing an elbow drop from the top of the cage on Knight through another table, D'Angelo removing Dunne's mouth guard before performing a neckbreaker with an assist from a crowbar, and Gargano and Ciampa performing their old DIY finisher, Meeting in the Middle, on Breakker. In the closing moments, Hayes performed a low blow on Gargano, after which, Ciampa knocked out both men. As Ciampa went for a Fairytale ending on Hayes, Breakker performed a Spear on Ciampa through a table positioned in the corner. Breakker then performed a Military Press Powerslam on Ciampa to win the match for his team.

Aftermath 
On the following episode of NXT, Kyle O'Reilly and Von Wagner faced each other in a Steel Cage match, where Wagner was victorious. Wagner viciously attacked O'Reilly with the cage door after the match. This ended up being O'Reilly's final WWE appearance, as his WWE contract expired after the event and chose not to renew it. O'Reilly then made his All Elite Wrestling (AEW) debut at AEW Holiday Bash later that month.

Also on NXT, Johnny Gargano addressed the NXT fans and talked about his future, only for Grayson Waller to viciously attack him with a steel chair. Waller ended the attack after planting Gargano with a Powerbomb through the announce table. This was also Gargano's final WWE appearance, as his contract expired after the event, but he returned on the main roster as part of the Raw brand on the August 22, 2022, episode of Raw.

On the December 14 episode of NXT, after Bron Breakker defeated NXT Cruiserweight Champion Roderick Strong in a non-title match, Tommaso Ciampa appeared and laid out Breakker with Willow's bell before standing tall with the NXT Championship as the show ended. The following week, Ciampa told Breakker that he would get another shot at the NXT Championship at New Year's Evil. At the event, Breakker defeated Ciampa to win the title for the first time.

A non-title match between Dexter Lumis and NXT North American Champion Carmelo Hayes took place on the following episode of NXT, where Lumis won via disqualification after interference from Trick Williams. After the match, Lumis attacked Williams before Hayes saved him and retreated. Two weeks later, Lumis defeated Williams.

Tony D'Angelo taking Pete Dunne's mouth guard during the men's WarGames match would start a rivalry between the two. On the December 14 episode of NXT, Dunne took his mouth guard back from D'Angelo. A match between the two took place the following week, where Dunne won. Following the match, however, D'Angelo attacked Dunne with a crowbar. A Crowbar on a Pole match between the two took place on the January 11, 2022, episode of NXT, where D'Angelo won. On the January 25 episode, D'Angelo lost a match to determine the number one contender for the NXT North American Championship after interference from Dunne. Eventually, a weaponized steel cage match between the two was scheduled for Vengeance Day, where Dunne won to end the feud.

Also on the following episode of NXT, Duke Hudson, who was wearing a blonde wig, talked about his loss to Cameron Grimes at WarGames when Grimes interrupted. Hudson told Grimes that he cheated to win and challenged him to a No Holds Barred match for the following week, and Grimes accepted. On that subsequent episode, Grimes defeated Hudson to end the feud. After the match, Grimes removed Hudson's wig to reveal his bald head.

Cora Jade took on Dakota Kai on the December 14 episode of NXT, where Jade was victorious. After the match, however, Kai attacked Jade, but Raquel González sent Kai retreating. Moments later, Gigi Dolin and Jacy Jayne distracted Jade, allowing Mandy Rose to attack her. Later that night, González and Kai were being pulled apart by referees while in the parking lot. Afterwards, González challenged Kai to a street fight for the following week, which was later made official. On that subsequent episode, González defeated Kai. Following the match, González called out Rose to demand a title rematch but got Jade instead. Moments later, Rose appeared on the TitanTron and challenged both of them to a triple threat match for the NXT Women's Championship at New Year's Evil. On the December 28 episode, Rose arranged a tag team match pitting Jade and González against Io Shirai and Kay Lee Ray for that episode's main event, where the winning team got to challenge her for the NXT Women's Championship at New Year's Evil. The match was won by Jade and González.

In 2022, the WarGames concept was moved to the main roster as part of Survivor Series, with that year's event rebranded as Survivor Series WarGames. This subsequently ended the NXT WarGames event, which was replaced by NXT Deadline.

Results

References

External links
 

2021 WWE Network events
2021 in professional wrestling in Florida
Events in Orlando, Florida
Professional wrestling in Orlando, Florida
December 2021 events in the United States
WWE NXT